Siena College of Taytay, also referred to by its acronym SCT, is a private, non-profit Catholic basic and higher education institution run by the Congregation of the Dominican Sisters of St. Catherine of Siena in Taytay, Rizal, Philippines. It was named St. Catherine Academy at foundation in 1957 by the Dominican Sisters of Siena and it is one of six Dominican educational institutions in the Philippines. Its sister schools are Siena College of Quezon City, Siena College of San Jose, Siena College of Hermosa, and Siena College of Tigaon.

History
In 1956, the late  Cardinal Rufino Santos of the Archbishop of Manila  invited the Dominican sisters to establish an academy for the education of local children. In 1957, Saint Catherine Academy opened during the tenure of the late Mother Natividad Pilapil O.P., the Superior General of the Congregation.

The college's facility was originally located in the Parish compound of St. John the Baptist in Taytay, Rizal. In 1965, the kindergarten, elementary and secondary education courses were fully established and recognized by the  Philippine Department of Education, Culture and Sports.

Facilities
The college's campus in Taytay is now located at East Rodriguez Avenue, Siena Heights, Barangay San Isidro, Taytay, Rizal. The main and oldest, facility, the three-story Saint Catherine Building located at the town proper adjacent to the Saint John the Baptist Parish church, was gutted by fire in 2002 and was not rebuilt. At the new location, a four-story building was constructed. This has a number of classrooms and a large Speech Laboratory in the newly added third floor. There are also houses for freshman high school students.

The Mother Natividad Pilapil O.P. (Latin: Ordinis Praedicatorum; English: Order of Preachers) building houses kindergarten 1 and 2, grade one pupils, and faculty rooms for their teachers.  It is located through Gate 1 of the campus.

The Saint Dominic De Guzman Building, named after the founder of the Dominican order, houses the junior and senior high school students, computer rooms for college and high school students, and the Cyber program. It also houses the registrar's office, guidance office, testing center, high school library, GLL  office, YLL office, and Instructional Media Center.

The Saint Thomas Aquinas Building contains instructional rooms for the senior high and college students, laboratories, and college library. It can be accessed through Gates 3 and 4. The building is named after the 13th-century philosopher.

The Our Lady of the Holy Rosary Building houses the publishing office, cafeteria, clinic and chapel.

The Saint Jacques Centre de Formatione - Hotelliere et Restaurateur (Saint Jacques Center for International Hospitality Education - Hotel and Restaurant) houses the college's signature program in Hotel and Restaurant Management. It also houses senior high students in the TECH-VOC Strand, with specialization in cookery. Historically, the Parisian Dominican house was located in the parish of Saint Jacques.

The  Mother Francisca  Hall is an auditorium. The San Lorenzo Ruiz Hall is named for the Filipino martyred during persecution of  Japanese Christians under the 17th-century Tokugawa Shogunate. The gymnasium offers student facilities, including the St. Catherine Covered Court, an Olympic-sized swimming pool, and the St. Martin Sports Complex.

The  Saint Albertus Magnus building was scheduled to house college students in the 2018–2019 school year. The building is composed of 24 rooms on four floors.

Basic education programs
Kinder 1 & 2
Grades 1 - 6
Junior High school 
Senior High School
Night High School (grade 7-10) (special program)
Lab High School

College programs
College of International Hospitality Management (CIHM)
Bachelor of Science in International Hospitality Management (BSIHM)
Bachelor of Science in Travel Management
Culinary Arts
College of Nursing
Bachelor of Science in Nursing
College of Business Administration (CBA)
Bachelor of Business Administration
Major in Management
Major in Advertisement
Major in Entrepreneurship
College of Engineering and Information Technology (CEIT)
Bachelor of Science in Computer Science (BSCS)
Bachelor of Science in Computer Engineering (BSCpE)
Bachelor of Science in Electronics and Communications Engineering (BSECE)
Bachelor of Science in Industrial Engineering (BSIE)
College of Education 
Bachelor of Science in Elementary Education
Specialization in General Education
Major in Special Education
Bachelor of Science in Secondary Education
Major in Mathematics
Major in English
Major in Guidance and Counseling
Major in Religious/Values Education

Student services
Chapel/Prayer Room
Siena Christian Community Development Center
Guidance Center
Learning Resource Center
Libraries
Grade School Library
High School Library
College Library
Science Laboratories
Integrated Science
Biology
Chemistry
Physics
Speech Laboratory
Math Laboratory
School Clinic
School Canteen
Practice House
Ballet Room
St. Lorenzo Hall
Bookstore and Supplies
Mother Francisca Hall/Auditorium
St. Catherine of Siena Audi-Gymnasium
St. Martin Sports Complex
CAT Office
MAPEH Office
Computer Laboratory
Technology and Livelihood Education (TLE) Room
St. Rose of Lima Conference Room
Prefect of Discipline
Security Services
Publications' Office
Supreme Student Council Office
Oval
Gazebo
Dormitory

High school administration
 Board of Trustees
 President
 Principal
 Asst. Principal/Coord. of Student Affairs and Activities
 Subject Area Team Leader
 Prefect of Discipline
 Campus Ministry Coordinator
Religion Coordinator
 Year Level Leader
Club Moderator
 Homeroom Adviser
 Guidance Counselor
 Psychometrician
 Coordinator of Libraries
Registrar
 Treasurer
 Property Custodian
 Computer Laboratory Coordinator
 Science Laboratory Coordinator
 ISCA Coordinator
 Institutional Planning and Research Coordinator
Institutional Scouting Coordinator
 School directors
 Faculty

BED publications
 The Scene
 La Recogida
 Scribble
 Kuliglig
 For Kids Only!

College publications
 Flambeau
 Sulo
 Pyre
 Llamear

Tertiary education
The modern Tertiary, or Third Order of Saint Dominic, as it exists in the 21st century, has two categories: regular, i.e. male or female Tertiaries who live in community and wear the habit; and secular Tertiaries, married or single, cleric or lay, who live their lives like others of their professions, but who privately practice the austerity of the order, wear some symbol of Dominican habit, and recite some of the liturgical offices.

Special awards
Lord Baden Powell Medallion
Perfect Attendance
Outstanding Artist of the Year
Terpsichorean Award
Athlete of the Year
Writer of the Year
Special Academic Award
Dr. Jose P. Rizal Leadership Medal
Manuel B. Villar, Jr. Excellence Award
Cadet/Cadette of the Year

Given to graduating students
Mother Francisca del Espiritu Santo de Fuentes Medal
St. Catherine Leadership Award
Mother Francisca Service Award
Excellence in Math and Science
Gerry Roxas Leadership Award
Jose P. Laurel
Sangguniang Kabataan Leadership Award
AY National Discipline Award
Insular Life Golden Eagle Award

See also
Siena College of Quezon City
Notre Dame-Siena College of Polomolok, South Cotabato

References
Siena College of Taytay official website
Siena College Taytay Handbook

Universities and colleges in Rizal
Catholic universities and colleges in the Philippines
Catholic secondary schools in the Philippines
Catholic elementary schools in the Philippines
Dominican educational institutions in the Philippines
Educational institutions established in 1957
1957 establishments in the Philippines